Pseudamnicola beckmanni is a species of small brackish water snail with an operculum, an aquatic gastropod mollusk in the family Hydrobiidae.

Distribution 
This species occurs on the Mediterranean island of Majorca.

References 

 Delicado D., Machordom A. & Ramos M.A. (2014) Vicariant versus dispersal processes in the settlement of Pseudamnicola (Caenogastropoda, Hydrobiidae) in the Mediterranean Balearic

Hydrobiidae
Gastropods described in 2007
Endemic fauna of the Balearic Islands